Taj Khatun or Taj Khatoon may refer to:

Taj Khatun, Qom
Taj Khatun, West Azerbaijan